Singles Club is an EP released by American rock band Paramore. The songs were released as promotional singles between October and December 2011, culminating in the release of a box set containing the three constituent songs plus "Monster", which was recorded during the same sessions. The EP and box set were released on December 14, 2011, on Paramore's website.  The EP is the first release of new material by Paramore not to include band members Josh and Zac Farro.

Background
On January 14, Paramore posted a rough demo of the song "In the Mourning" on YouTube. The finished song in its entirety was played for the first time live on their South American Tour in early 2011. On September 7, Paramore performed at the fifteenth anniversary of their record label, Fueled by Ramen. New songs, "Renegade" and "In the Mourning" with an extract of a paragraph of "Landslide" by Fleetwood Mac was played. "Renegade" was the first song released off the Singles Club, available exclusively from the Paramore website. "Renegade" was featured as a short introduction tune on the web-series, "From the Field" – a mock-umentary of the band's daily lives on the Summer Warped Tour.

On October 11, Paramore announced they would be releasing new songs only available directly from their official website. "Renegade" was released on October 11, "Hello Cold World" on November 7 and "In the Mourning" on December 5.
 On November 11, some of the first images of the Singles Club Box Set were posted online.

Live performances
Not too long after it was posted online, "In the Mourning" was played Live on Paramore's South American tour and along with 'Renegade", was played at the Fueled By Ramen 15th Anniversary Concert at Terminal 5 In New York City. "Monster", which is available with the Singles Club boxset but not with the download from the website, was also played at the anniversary and was played on some of the band's concerts after the release of the songs.

Track listing

Formats
 Singles Club digital songs + shirt + 7" box set
 Singles Club digital songs + 7" box set
 Singles Club digital songs

Personnel
 Hayley Williams – lead vocals
 Jeremy Davis – bass guitar
 Taylor York – guitar, drums

References

Paramore EPs
2011 EPs
Fueled by Ramen EPs
Fan-club-release albums
Albums produced by Rob Cavallo